3,4-Methylenedioxycathinone (also known as MDC, Nitrilone, Amylone and βk-MDA) is an empathogen and stimulant of the phenethylamine, amphetamine, and cathinone classes and the β-keto analogue of MDA.

Methylenedioxycathinone has been investigated as antidepressant and antiparkinson agent.

See also 
 4-Methylcathinone
 4-Methylmethcathinone
 Methylone

References 

Substituted amphetamines
Cathinones
Entactogens and empathogens
Euphoriants
Benzodioxoles
Serotonin-norepinephrine-dopamine releasing agents